"We're Gonna Do It Again" was a single released on 1 May 1995 by the English football team Manchester United for the 1995 FA Cup Final. It entered the charts at number 15 and peaked at number 6 on May 14th. UK Singles Chart.

References

1995 singles
Manchester United F.C. songs
Football songs and chants
1995 songs